David Albert  Ames (born 10 August 1983) is a British actor, best known for his portrayal of Dominic Copeland in the medical drama Holby City. Appeared in The Madame Blanc Mystery on Channel 5 on 26 January 2023

Early life and career
Before getting a degree in drama, Ames was involved in plays at college. He appeared in the play The Temperamentals as Rudi Geinrich at Greenwich Theatre. So So Gay called his performance in the play "touching". From 2013-2022, he joined the cast of Holby City as Dominic Copeland.

In 2022, Ames starred as Steven in the play Steve, which was performed at the Seven Dials Playhouse. Ames starred as Tim / Butterfly in Horse-Play at the Riverside Studios, London, in August-September 2022.

Personal life
Ames is gay. Prior to becoming an actor, he lived with his family in Hampshire.

Filmography

Theatre
 2022 - Steve - as Steven - at the Seven Dials Playhouse
 2022 - Horse-Play - as Tim / Butterfly - at the Riverside Studios

References

External links

Living people
English male film actors
English male television actors
English gay actors
1983 births
21st-century English male actors
English male voice actors
Place of birth missing (living people)
Male actors from Hampshire
English LGBT actors
20th-century English LGBT people
21st-century English LGBT people